The Ngakawau River is a river of the West Coast Region of New Zealand's South Island. It flows generally northwest, reaching the Tasman Sea at Hector.

The New Zealand Ministry for Culture and Heritage gives a translation of "the shags" for Ngākawau.

The Charming Creek Railway line used to run alongside Ngakawau River in the Lower Ngakawau Gorge, transporting coal from mines in the Ngakawau River catchment area. The disused bush tram track now forms a section of the Charming Creek Walkway.  3 km into the gorge, Mangatini Stream joins Ngakawau River over the 25 m tall Mangatini Falls.

Parts of the Upper Ngakawau Gorge are the only known habitat of the rare daisy Celmisia morganii.

Ngakawau River is polluted with acid mine drainage and coal fines from the Stockton Mine. The proposed Stockton Plateau Hydro Project is expected to reduce the levels of pollutants.

The Ngakawau Riverwatch environmental group formed in 2001 to address the water pollution in the river.

See also
Rivers of New Zealand

References

Rivers of the West Coast, New Zealand
Rivers of New Zealand